If All Goes Wrong is a feature-length documentary about The Smashing Pumpkins, which chronicles the band's residencies at The Orange Peel in Asheville and The Fillmore in San Francisco in summer 2007.  It was screened, in competition, at Ghent Film Festival in October 2008.  It also screened in select theaters in the United States on November 6, 2008, as well as in other countries, including the United Kingdom, Canada, Germany, Australia and New Zealand.

The documentary covers Pumpkins frontman Billy Corgan's attempts to write and debut new music at the residencies, as well as the revival of the band with new members.  Much of the documentary deals with the struggle to remain relevant as a band, both artistically and commercially.

The documentary was released as part of a two-disc DVD set.  The first disc contains the documentary, as well as Voices of the Ghost Children, a featurette about the band's fans, and an interview with The Who guitarist Pete Townshend.  The second disc contains 15 songs recorded at various points during the residency, all mixed in surround sound with five songs recorded during rehearsals on the floor of the venue included.

On February 14, 2009, the DVD won Outstanding Achievement in Sound Mixing in the DVD Original Programming category at the Cinema Audio Society awards.

Track listing
The Fillmore Residency
"The Rose March"
"Peace + Love"
"99 Floors"
"Blue Skies Bring Tears"
"Superchrist"
"Lucky 13"
"Starla"
"Death from Above"
"The Crying Tree of Mercury"
"Winterlong"
"Heavy Metal Machine"
"Untitled"
"No Surrender"
"Gossamer"
"Zeitgeist"

Live from the Floor of the Fillmore
"99 Floors"
"Peace + Love"
"Mama"
"No Surrender"
"Promise Me"

Release history
United States, Canada: November 11, 2008
Australia: November 14, 2008
The Netherlands: November 24, 2008
United Kingdom: December 1, 2008

Personnel
The Smashing Pumpkins
Billy Corgan – Vocals, guitar
Jimmy Chamberlin – Drums, Guitar on "Zeitgeist"
Ginger Reyes – Bass, vocals
Jeff Schroeder – Guitar, vocals
Lisa Harriton – Keyboards, vocals

Production
Jack Gulick – producer, director
Daniel Catullo – producer, director
Tilton Gardner – executive producer
Jeff Geoffray – executive producer
Walter Josten – executive producer
Justin Coloma – principal editor
Jon Lemon – live audio mixer
Kerry Brown – re-recording audio mixer
Kevin Dippold – re-recording audio mixer
Brian Slack – re-recording audio mixer
Linda Strawberry – cover artist
Lauren DiSalvi-Salciccia  - transcriptionist
Kateri Forbes - Corgan's personal assistant

Chart positions

References

External links 

Official site

2000s English-language films
The Smashing Pumpkins video albums
Live video albums
Rockumentaries
American documentary films
2008 documentary films